Requiem for the Conqueror is a science fiction novel by American writer W. Michael Gear.

Plot introduction
Set in a future when humanity has forgotten its origins in earth, the novel describes the political equations and power struggle between the emperor, a quasireligious group, a pre-sentient computer named the MagComm and the Lord Commander.

Plot summary

Humanity is trapped in a "gravity well", the so-called Forbidden Borders and there is increasing conflict because of ever-decreasing space resources. Staffa Kar Therma, also known as the Lord Commander, is a mercenary who leads an elite group of soldiers (the Companions) and aligns himself to the group that pays him the most. He is separated from his soldiers and falls into the hands of a slave trader but escapes, and comes into contact with a quasi-religious group led by the magister (who in turn is advised by the MagComm). The magister (under the guidance of the MagComm) believes that the Lord Commander is the root of all evil and attempts to assassinate him. Meanwhile, Staffa discovers that his son is alive and is the leader of a battalion of the emperor's forces. Staffa finally escapes from the magister and the MagComm, killing the former and partially destroying the latter. The partially destroyed MagComm's automated repair mechanisms kick in and the computer becomes self-aware.

Characters
The Others: The (supposedly alien and superintelligent) beings who confined humanity inside the Forbidden Borders. They also built the MagComm.
Staffa Kar Therma aka the Lord Commander of the Companions: the main protagonist
Magister Bruen
Sinklar Fist: Son of Staffa Kar Therma.
Chrysla: Wife of Staffa. She supposedly dies on the Praetor's Flagship "Pylos", that Staffa himself destroyed, but in fact survived.

External links
 Book review on sfsite.com [scroll down]

1991 American novels
American science fiction novels
DAW Books books